The Scottish Transport and General Workers' Union (Docks) was a trade union representing dock workers in Scotland, principally around Glasgow.

The union was founded in 1932 by dock workers who resigned from the Transport and General Workers' Union (TGWU), in protest at its inability to get employers to agree to compulsory registration of dockers.  Many of the dockers were former members of the Scottish Union of Dock Labourers and Transport Workers.  Despite the split, the union worked alongside the TGWU with little conflict, and it merged back into the TGWU in 1972.

See also

 List of trade unions
 Transport and General Workers' Union
 TGWU amalgamations

References

Arthur Ivor Marsh, Victoria Ryan. Historical Directory of Trade Unions, Volume 5 Ashgate Publishing, Ltd., Jan 1, 2006 pg. 437

Defunct trade unions of Scotland
Port workers' trade unions
Transport and General Workers' Union amalgamations
Defunct transport organisations based in the United Kingdom
Trade unions disestablished in 1972